Enos House, also known as Warren House, is a historic home located on Enos Farm Drive near Surry, Surry County, Virginia.  It was built about 1810, and is a -story, double pile hall-parlor plan frame dwelling.  It has a gable roof and features a low, full-length shed porch on the front facade.  It has a 20th-century rear ell.

It was listed on the National Register of Historic Places in  1977.  The farm is now owned by Surry County, which has developed it for recreational purposes.  The property, but not the house, is open to the public.

Notes

Houses on the National Register of Historic Places in Virginia
Houses completed in 1810
National Register of Historic Places in Surry County, Virginia
Houses in Surry County, Virginia